Telephones  main lines in use:
7.332 million (2011)

Telephones  mobile cellular:
28,782,000 (2011)

Telephone system:
modern and expanding
domestic:
domestic satellite system with 3 earth stations; recent substantial improvement in telephone service in rural areas; substantial increase in digitalization of exchanges and trunk lines; installation of a national interurban fibre-optic network capable of digital multimedia services; combined fixed and mobile-cellular telephone subscribership 130 per 100 persons
international:
country code  58; submarine cable systems provide connectivity to the Caribbean, Central and South America, and US; satellite earth stations  1 Intelsat (Atlantic Ocean) and 1 PanAmSat; participating with Colombia, Ecuador, Peru, and Bolivia in the construction of an international fiber-optic network; constructing submarine cable to provide connectivity to Cuba

Broadcast media
The government of Venezuela supervises a mixture of state-run and private broadcast media; 1 state-run TV network, 4 privately owned TV networks, a privately owned news channel with limited national coverage, and a government-backed Pan-American channel.  A state-run radio network includes 65 new stations and roughly another 30 stations targeted at specific audiences.  A state-sponsored community broadcasters include 244 radio stations and 36 TV stations.  The number of private broadcast radio stations have been declining, but many remain in operation.

Internet

Internet Hosts:
1.016 million (2012)

Internet Users:
8.918 million (2009)

Country code (Top level domain): VE

Venezuela has many Internet service providers, although the market is dominated by the now state-owned CANTV.net which offers ADSL and Dialup services.
Broadband access Venezuela is provided through ADSL, Cable, Satellite, EDGE, Evolution-Data Optimized (EV-DO), Wi-Fi Hotspots and more recently WiMax. Prices vary from US$45 to $60 per month for basic broadband plans.
Some of the most important providers are:
 CANTV.net  ADSL and Wi-Fi hotspots and also EV-DO through the Movilnet brand.
 Intercable  Cable and Wi-Fi Hotspots
 Movistar  Cable, WLL, EV-DO, UMTS, HSDPA, and LTE
 Movilmax  WiMax (Only available in Caracas)
 Digitel  GSM, UMTS, HSDPA, and LTE

External links
 
 Venezuela, SubmarineCableMap.com

 
 
Venezuela